Katarzyna Walter (born 23 February 1960 in Krakow ) - Polish actress, film and theater .

In 1983 she graduated from the Academy of Dramatic Arts in Wroclaw . In the years 1983 - 1984 occurred in the Contemporary Theatre in Wroclaw. In the years 1984 - one thousand nine hundred ninety performed in the Studio Theatre in Warsaw.

The film was also reported under the names: Catherine Zadrożny, Catherine Walter-Sakowitch Eve Zadrożna and Katarzyna Walter.

Dancing with the Stars

She has participated in the eighth edition of Dancing with the Stars . Her partner has been Krzysztof Hulboj, with whom she has taken the 11th place.

Filmography

 2007 : On the Common, as Agnes Olszewska
 2006-2007 : Hela out on a limb episode. 3 and 23, as Bozena
 2006 : Magda M. episode. 17-18, as Barbara Janicka
 2006 : You'll be mine, as Dagmar
 2005 : The good and the bad episode. 221, as Natalia Hertman
 2005 : Boston Legal episode. 17, as head of an advertising agency
 2005 : Guardian Angel Episode. 3 and 5, as Dominic
 2004-2006 : Breakfast at the Rose, as Alice Bird
 2004 : Out of range, as Madame Konya
 2004 : Cesar hollow episode. 4, as Mary Holy Cross
 2003 : Neighbours episode. 25, as Miranda Okhotsk
 2003 : Residents episode. 150, as the bark Wine
 1997 : Spellbinder: Land of the Dragon Lord as Guin (episode 11-15)
 1994 : Death in shallow water, as Martha
 1993 : The New Adventures of Arsene Lupin, as Natasha
 1992 : Republic of Dreams ( der Republik trauma ), as Dorothy
 1991 : Long live love, as Natalia Brońska (uncredited as Catherine Walter-Sakowitch)
 1990 : Talking about love, as Eve
 1990 : Stone mystery, as Joanna
 1990 : Femina, a prostitute in front of the hotel
 1990 : Prominent, as the wife of the Mountain
 1990 : Armelle
 1988 : Error in account, as Dorota Milewicz
 1987 : The eleventh commandment, as Maria
 1985 : Season for pheasants
 1985 : The freedom, as Ula Malak
 1985 : I like bats, as Iza
 1984 : Idol, as a girl Soltan (uncredited as Zadrożna)
 1981 : 07 report the episode. 10-11, as secretary of Major Wołczyk

References

1960 births
Actresses from Kraków
Living people
Polish actresses